Deleted in malignant brain tumors 1 protein is a protein that in humans is encoded by the DMBT1 gene.

Function 

Loss of sequences from human chromosome 10q has been associated with the progression of human cancers.  The gene DMBT1 was originally isolated based on its deletion in a medulloblastoma cell line.  DMBT1 is expressed with transcripts of 6.0, 7.5, and 8.0 kb in fetal lung and with one transcript of 8.0 kb in adult lung, although the 7.5 kb transcript has not been characterized.  The DMBT1 protein is a glycoprotein containing multiple scavenger receptor cysteine-rich (SRCR) domains separated by SRCR-interspersed domains (SID).  Transcript variant 2 (8.0 kb) has been shown to bind surfactant protein D independently of carbohydrate recognition.  This indicates that DMBT1 may not be a classical tumor suppressor gene, but rather play a role in the interaction of tumor cells and the immune system.

Pattern recognition and potential use of DMBT1 in nanomedicine 
At epithelial barriers molecular pattern recognition mechanisms act as minesweepers against harmful environmental factors and thereby play a crucial role in the defense against invading bacterial and viral pathogens. However, it became evident that some of the proteins participating in these host defense processes may simultaneously function as regulators of tissue regeneration when in the extracellular matrix, thus coupling defense functions with regulation of stem cells. Although molecular pattern recognition has complex physiological roles and we just begin to understand its various functions, the simplicity of the underlying principles for recognition of specific classes of molecules may generate novel starting points for nanomedical approaches in drug delivery across epithelial barriers. The protein DMBT1, showed pattern recognition activity for poly-sulfated and poly-phosphorylated ligands, including nucleic acids, and the ability to aggregate ligands. This raises the interesting question in how far these properties can be utilized to assemble nucleic acidpeptide nano-complexes and whether this can be exploited to modulate the pharmacological properties of nucleic acids and/or for nucleic acid delivery to target cells  Recently, DMBT1-derived peptides have been successfully harnessed for siRNA intracellular delivery.

Interactions 

DMBT1 has been shown to interact with Surfactant protein D. DMBT1-derived peptides also interacts with nucleic acids.

References

Further reading 

 
 
 
 
 
 
 
 
 
 
 
 
 
 
 
 
 
 
 

Extracellular matrix proteins
Glycoproteins